The Agrio River is a river of Argentina. The river starts in the Andes Mountains and eventually joins the Neuquén River.

See also
List of rivers of Argentina

References
 Rand McNally, The New International Atlas, 1993.
  GEOnet Names Server 

Rivers of Neuquén Province
Rivers of Argentina